The goat grazing problem is either of two related problems in recreational mathematics involving a tethered goat grazing a circular area: the interior grazing problem and the exterior grazing problem. The former involves grazing the interior of a circular area, and the latter, grazing an exterior of a circular area. For the exterior problem, the constraint that the rope can not enter the circular area dictates that the grazing area forms an involute. If the goat were instead tethered to a post on the edge of a circular path of pavement that did not obstruct the goat (rather than a fence or a silo), the interior and exterior problem would be complements of a simple circular area.

The original problem was the exterior grazing problem and appeared in the 1748 edition of the English annual journal The Ladies' Diary: or, the Woman's Almanack, designated as Question  attributed to Upnorensis (an unknown historical figure), stated thus:
Observing a horse tied to feed in a gentlemen’s park, with one end of a rope to his fore foot, and the other end to one of the circular iron rails, enclosing a pond, the circumference of which rails being 160 yards, equal to the length of the rope, what quantity of ground at most, could the horse feed?
The related problem involving area in the interior of a circle without reference to barnyard animals first appeared in 1894 in the first edition of the renown journal American Mathematical Monthly. Attributed to Charles E. Myers, it was stated as:
A circle containing one acre is cut by another whose center is on the circumference of the given circle, and the area common to both is one-half acre. Find the radius of the cutting circle.
The solutions in both cases are non-trivial but yield to straightforward application of trigonometry, analytical geometry or integral calculus.  Both problems are intrinsically transcendental – they do not have closed-form analytical solutions in the Euclidean plane. The numerical answers must be obtained by an iterative approximation procedure. The goat problems do not yield any new mathematical insights; rather they are primarily exercises in how to artfully deconstruct problems in order to facilitate solution.

Three-dimensional analogues and planar boundary/area problems on other shapes, including the obvious rectangular barn and/or field, have been proposed and solved. A generalized solution for any smooth convex curve like an ellipse, and even unclosed curves, has been formulated.

Exterior grazing problem

The question about the grazable area outside a circle is considered. This concerns a situation where the animal is tethered to a silo. The complication here is that the grazing area overlaps around the silo (i.e., in general, the tether is longer than one half the circumference of the silo): the goat can only eat the grass once, he can't eat it twice. The answer to the problem as proposed was given in the 1749 issue of the magazine by a Mr. Heath, and stated as 76,257.86 sq.yds. which was arrived at partly by "trial and a table of logarithms". The answer is not so accurate as the number of digits of precision would suggest. No analytical solution was provided.

A useful approximation
Let tether length R = 160 yds. and silo radius r = R/(2) yds. The involute in the fourth quadrant is a nearly circular arc. One can imagine a circular segment with the same perimeter (arc length) would enclose nearly the same area; the radius and therefore the area of that segment could be readily computed. Let c be the length of an arc segment of the involute between the y-axis and a vertical line tangent to the silo at θ = 3/2; it is the arc subtended by Φ. (while the arc is minutely longer than r, the difference is negligible). So . The area of the involute excludes half the area of the silo (1018.61) in the fourth quadrant, so its approx area is 18146, and the grazable area including the half circle of radius R, totals . That is 249 sq.yds. greater than the correct area of 76256, an error of just 0.33%. This method of approximating may not be quite so good for angles < 3/2 of the involute.

If it matters, there is a constructive way to obtain a quick and very accurate estimate of : draw a diagonal from point  on the circumference of the pond to its intersection on the y-axis. So the other leg of the triangle, the hypotenuse as drawn, is  yds. So  radians, rounded to three places.

Solution by integrating with polar coordinates
Find the area between a circle and its involute over an angle of 2 to −2 excluding any overlap. In Cartesian coordinates, the equation of the involute is transcendental; doing a line integral there is hardly feasible. A more felicitous approach is to use polar coordinates (z,θ). Because the "sweep" of the area under the involute is bounded by a tangent line (see diagram and derivation below) which is not the boundary between overlapping areas, the decomposition of the problem results in four computable areas: a half circle whose radius is the tether length (A1); the area "swept" by the tether over an angle of 2 (A2); the portion of area A2 from θ = 0 to the tangent line segment  (A3); and the wedge area qFtq (A4). So, the desired area A is A1 + (A2 − A3 + A4) · 2. The area(s) required to be computed are between two quadratic curves, and will necessarily be an integral or difference of integrals.

Let  be the point of intersection of the circumference of the pond on the y-axis (opposite to ) below the origin. Then let acute  be .

The area under the involute is a function of  because it is an integral over a quadratic curve. The area has a fixed boundary defined by the parameter  (i.e. the circumference of the silo). So we seek an expression for the area under the involute .

First, the area A1 is a half circle of radius  so 

Next, find the angle  which will be used in the limits of the integrals below. Finally, and the following equation is obtained: . That is a transcendental equation that can only be solved by trial-and-error, polynomial expansion, or an iterative procedure like Newton–Raphson. .

Next compute the area between the circumference of the pond and involute. Compute the area in the tapering "tail" of the involute, i.e. the overlapped area (note, on account of the tangent tF, that this area includes the wedge section, area A4, which will have to be added back in during the final summation). Recall that the area of a circular sector is  if the angle is in radians. The area under the involute is the sum of all the infinitely many infinitely thin sectors  through some angle . This sum is

 

Is not given, and must be determined indirectly. It seems apropo to merge a factor of  into the constant term to get a common denominartor for the terms, so .  is dominated by a linear term from the integration, so may be written,  where  is a non-zero positive but negligible quantity.

A4 is the area of the peculiar wedge . So, .

That's useful for elucidating the relationships between the parameters.  is transcendental, so the definition is a recurrence relation. The numerical answer is  rounded up to the nearest square yard. It is worth noting that , which is the answer given for the case where the tether length is half the circumference (or any length such that ) of the silo, or no overlap to account for. The goat can eat all but 5% of the area of the great circle defined by its tether length, and half the area it cannot eat is within the perimeter of the pond/silo. The only imprecision in the calculation is that no closed-form representation for  can be derived from the geometry presented. But small inaccuracies in  when  don't significantly affect the final result.

Solution by ratio of arc length

Interior grazing problem

Let  be the center of a unit circle. A goat/bull/horse is tethered at point  on the circumference. How long does the rope  need to be to allow the animal to graze on exactly one half of the circle's area (white area in diagram, in plane geometry, called a lens)?

A useful approximation
The analytical solutions are arduous and yield a transcendental formula, which must be iterated to produce a numerical approximation. A rough and quick approximation may be suitable for most practical applications and is obtainable by a few simple observations.

First, a chord drawn through the center  of the enclosing circle perpendicular to the radius at  divides the area in half. A radius of the cutting circle equal to the radius of the enclosing circle (i.e. unit length) will sweep much but not all of the area below the chord. A radius of the cutting circle that reaches either end of the chord (i.e. length  ≈ 1.414) will sweep out the entire area below the chord plus a thin circular segment above the chord. So a plausible radius length is the mean of the two. But the swept area is expanding quadratically, not linearly, with the radius, so the harmonic mean rather than the arithmetic mean is preferable, i.e. 1.189... This is accurate to within ~2.5% and quite usable in a practical situation, and the procedure is easy to replicate.

A much better approximation may be had by the observation that the relationship between tether length and grazable area is substantially linear in the relevant range [1, ]:

 

At , the approximated tether length  is 1.15945, an error of just 0.06%.

Solution by calculating the lens area 
The area reachable by the animal is in the form of an asymmetric lens, delimited by the two circular arcs.

The area  of a lens with two circles of radii  and distance between centers  is

 

 

Solution using integration 
By using  and integrating over the right half of the lens area with

 

the transcendental equation

 

follows, with the same solution.

Solution by sector area plus segment area 
The area can be written as the sum of sector area plus segment area.

Assuming the leash is tied to the bottom of the pen, define  as the angle the taut leash makes with upwards when the goat is at the circumference. Define  as the angle from downwards to the same location, but from the center of the pen instead of from the center of the larger circle. The sum of angles of a triangle equals  for the resulting isosceles triangle, giving . Setting the pen's radius to be 1 and trigonometry such as  then give .

Requiring that half the grazable area be 1/4 of the pen's area gives . Using the circular sector and circular segment area formulae gives

 ,

which only assumes .

Combining into a single equation gives

 .

Note that solving for  then taking the cosine of both sides generates extra solutions even if including the obvious constraint .

Using trigonometric identities, we see that this is the same transcendental equation that lens area and integration provide.

Closed-form solution 
By using complex analysis methods, Ingo Ullisch obtained a closed-form solution as the cosine of a ratio of two contour integrals:

 
where C is the circle .

3-dimensional extension

The three-dimensional analogue to the two-dimensional goat problem is a bird tethered to the inside of a sphere, with the tether long enough to constrain the bird's flight to half the volume of the sphere. In the three-dimensional case, point  lies on the surface of a unit sphere, and the problem is to find radius  of the second sphere so that the volume of the intersection body equals exactly half the volume of the unit sphere.

The volume of the unit sphere reachable by the animal has the form of a three-dimensional lens with differently shaped sides and defined by the two spherical caps.

The volume  of a lens with two spheres of radii  and distance between the centers  is

 

 

leading to a solution of 

It can be demonstrated that, with increasing dimensionality, the reachable area approaches one half the sphere at the critical length . If , the area covered approaches almost none of the sphere; if , the area covered approaches the sphere's entire area.

See also
Mrs. Miniver's problem, another problem of equalizing areas of circular lunes and lenses

References

External links 
 
 
 The Goat Problem - Numberphile video about the goat problem.

Recreational mathematics
Circles
Area